The 2004 Sri Lanka tsunami train wreck is the largest single rail disaster in world history by death toll, with 1,700 fatalities or more. It occurred when a crowded passenger train was destroyed on a coastal railway in Sri Lanka by a tsunami that followed the 2004 Indian Ocean earthquake. The tsunami subsequently caused over 30,000 reported deaths and billions of rupees in property damage in the coastal areas of Sri Lanka.

Train

Train #50 Matara Express was a regular train operating between the cities of Colombo and Galle. On Sunday, 26 December 2004, during both the Buddhist full moon holiday and the Christmas holiday weekend, it left Colombo's Fort Station shortly after 6:50 A.M. with over 1,500 paid passengers and an unknown number of unpaid passengers including the ones with travel passes (called Seasons) and government travel permits.

The train was pulled by locomotive #591 Manitoba, a Sri Lanka Railways class M2a built in 1956 by General Motors Diesel of Canada as a model G12.

Attempts to stop the train
Sri Lanka's seismic monitoring station at Pallekele registered the earthquake within minutes but did not consider it possible for a tsunami to reach the island.
When tsunami reports first reached the dispatching office in Maradana, officials were able to halt eight trains running on the Coastal Line, but were unable to reach the Matara Express. 

Efforts to halt the train at Ambalangoda failed because all station personnel was assisting with the train, and no one was available to answer the phone until after the train had departed. Attempts to reach personnel at stations further south failed as they had fled or been killed by the waves.

Tsunami waves strike the crowded train

At 9:30 A.M., in the village of Peraliya, near Telwatta, the beach saw the first of the gigantic waves thrown up by the earthquake. The train came to a halt as water surged around it, and an alarm sounded to alert the population about the increase in the water level. Hundreds of locals, believing the train to be secure on the rails, climbed onto the top of the cars to avoid being swept away. Others stood behind the train, hoping it would shield them from the force of the water. The first wave flooded the carriages and caused panic amongst the passengers. Ten minutes later a huge wave picked the train up and smashed it against the trees and houses which lined the track, crushing those seeking shelter behind it. 

The eight carriages were so packed with people that the doors could not be opened while they filled with water, drowning almost everyone inside as the water washed over the wreckage several more times. The passengers on top of the train were thrown clear of the uprooted carriages, and most drowned or were crushed by debris. Locomotive #591 Manitoba was carried , coming to rest in a swamp. Both engineer Janaka Fernando and assistant Sivaloganathan died at their posts.

Casualties
Due to the huge scale of the tsunami disaster, the local authorities were unable to cope with the devastation, and emergency services and the military were so overwhelmed that immediate rescue was not possible. In fact, the Sri Lankan authorities had no idea where the train was for several hours until it was spotted by an army helicopter around 4:00 PM. The local emergency services were destroyed, and it was a long time before help arrived. Dozens of people badly injured in the disaster died in the wreckage during the day, and many bodies were not retrieved for over a week. Some families descended on the area determined to find their relatives themselves. A forensic team from Colombo photographed and fingerprinted the unclaimed bodies at Batapola Hospital so the records could be stored and looked at after the bodies were buried.

According to the Sri Lankan authorities, only about 150 people on the train survived. The estimated death toll was at least 1,700 people, and probably over 2,000, although only approximately 900 bodies were recovered, as many were swept out to sea or taken away by relatives. The town of Peraliya was also destroyed, losing hundreds of citizens and all but ten buildings to the waves. Baddegama Samitha, a Buddhist monk, helped perform funeral rites along with his students. More than 200 of the bodies retrieved were not identified or claimed, and were buried three days later in a Buddhist ceremony near the torn railway line.

Aftermath
 
The first anniversary ceremonies were held in the rebuilt town alongside the repaired railway, which still operates a Colombo-to-Galle service, employing the same guard, W. Karunatilaka, who was on the train and survived the disaster.
Locomotive #591 Manitoba and two of the damaged carriages were salvaged and rebuilt. A wave was added to the locomotive's paint job as a memorial. The rebuilt locomotive and carriages returned to Peraliya on 26 December 2008, and every year since, to take part in a religious ceremony and a memorial, held to remember those who lost their lives.

See also
List of rail accidents (2000–09)
Transport in Sri Lanka
Sri Lanka Railways

Notes

External links

BBC News Report
USA Today Report
Traveler's report
BBC first anniversary commemoration
Sri Lankan account
The Peraliya Official Website
Steele, Jonathan. "One train, more than 1,700 dead.", The Guardian. 29 December 2004.
Daily Mirror 26.12.2008

2004 Indian Ocean earthquake and tsunami
Railway accidents in 2004
2004 in Sri Lanka
History of Sri Lanka (1948–present)
Derailments in Sri Lanka
December 2004 events in Asia
2004 disasters in Sri Lanka